Qarah Kahriz District is a district (bakhsh) in Shazand County, Markazi Province, Iran. At the 2006 census, its population was 25,040, in 6,627 families.  The District has one city: Bazneh. The District has one rural district (dehestan): Qarah Kahriz Rural District.

References 

Shazand County
Districts of Markazi Province